Lednikovoye is a lake on the Northern Island of Novaya Zemlya, administratively belongs to the Arkhangelsk region of Russia.

The lake is of glacial origin, formed by water damming by ridges of terminal moraines of glaciers after their retreat. The lake is located on a lowland stretching in the latitudinal direction from the Severnaya Sulmeneva Bay of the western shore to the glacier in the central part of the island.

Due to modern climate warming, over the period from 1999 to 2016, the boundaries of the glaciers in the lake retreated by more than a mile, thereby significantly increasing its area. As a result of the retreat of glaciers, a chain of new islands was formed in the lake in its western part. Its area, most likely, exceeded the area of Lake Goltsovoye (another big lake of the island) and, thus, Lednikovoye became the largest inland reservoir of the Novaya Zemlya archipelago. In addition to the five glaciers that flow directly into the lake, about a dozen more glaciers descend to it, but do not reach the water.

See also 
 List of fjords of Russia

References

Biosphere reserves of Russia
Taymyr
Novaya Zemlya
Glacial lakes of Russia